Wayne Anthony Smith (born November 17, 1979) is a former professional Canadian football offensive lineman who played in the Canadian Football League (CFL) from 2004 to 2017. He was drafted first overall by the Hamilton Tiger-Cats in the 2004 CFL Draft and spent four seasons over two stints with the team. Smith won a Grey Cup championship with the Saskatchewan Roughriders in 2007. He was also a member of the Toronto Argonauts of the CFL and the Washington Redskins and Denver Broncos of the National Football League. He announced his retirement in April 2017. He played college football at Appalachian State.

References

External links
 Wayne Smith CFLPA bio

1979 births
Appalachian State Mountaineers football players
Black Canadian players of Canadian football
Denver Broncos players
Hamilton Tiger-Cats players
Living people
Players of Canadian football from Ontario
Saskatchewan Roughriders players
Sportspeople from Etobicoke
Canadian football people from Toronto
Toronto Argonauts players
Washington Redskins players